Left of the dial refers to the college and other non-commercial radio stations in the United States that broadcast from the reserved band of the FM spectrum.  It can also refer to:

 "Left of the Dial" (song), a song from the 1985 album Tim by the Replacements that popularized the term
 Left of the Dial: Dispatches from the '80s Underground, a 2004 American compilation album of 1980s music
 "Left of the Dial", programme six of the 2007 BBC Two television series Seven Ages of Rock
 Left of the Dial (film), a 2005 HBO documentary about the founding of Air America